The Anglican Breviary is the Anglican edition of the Divine Office translated into English, used especially by Anglicans of Anglo-Catholic churchmanship. It is based on the Roman Breviary as it existed prior to both the Second Vatican Council and the 1955 liturgical reforms of Pope Pius XII.

It contains the liturgical offices of the hours:
Matins or Midnight Prayer (Midnight)
Lauds or Dawn Prayer (Dawn)
Prime or Early Morning Prayer (6 am)
Terce or Mid-Morning Prayer (9 am)
Sext or Midday Prayer (12 noon)
None or Mid-Afternoon Prayer (3 pm)
Vespers or Evening Prayer (6 pm)
Compline or Night Prayer (9 pm)

See also 

Anglican Missal
English Missal

External links
Anglican Breviary website
Online Anglican Breviary (liturgy.io/anglican)
Anglican Versions of the Breviary, by T. J. Williams
Anglican Gradual and Sacramentary
The Anglican Missal
The Monastic Diurnal

Anglo-Catholicism
Breviaries

Anglican liturgical books